The clerk of the New Zealand House of Representatives is an officer of the New Zealand House of Representatives and is the principal officer (chief executive) of the Office of the Clerk of the House of Representatives.

Role
The clerk of the House of Representatives advises the speaker of the New Zealand House of Representatives and members of parliament on matters of parliamentary procedure. Other functions of the clerk of the House include: to record the proceedings and decisions of the House, to certify bills ready for royal assent, to issue the Order Paper (order of business) for each sitting day, to administer the oath or affirmation of allegiance for members of Parliament after a general election, and to oversee the provision of secretariat services for the House and its committees.

Clerk David Wilson took office on 6 July 2015 following the retirement of Mary Winifred Harris.

List of Clerks of the New Zealand House of Representatives

References

External links 
 New Zealand Parliament Website 

 
Government agencies of New Zealand
New Zealand House of Representatives
Parliament of New Zealand
Officers of the Parliament of New Zealand